En carne propia (English title: In my flesh) is a Mexican telenovela produced by Carlos Téllez for Televisa in 1990. The story based by Octavio Muriel, because he had no hand but a metal prosthesis, was nicknamed "The hand squeezes".

Edith González and Eduardo Yáñez starred as protagonists, while Gonzalo Vega as the main antagonist/main villain. Sebastian Ligarde starred as stellar performance. With the special participation of Angélica Aragón.

Cast 

 Edith González as Estefanía Rafaela Muriel Dumont/Natalia de Jesús Ortega/Maria Estefanía Serret Dumont
 Eduardo Yáñez as Leonardo Rivadeneira
 Gonzalo Vega  as Octavio Muriel
 Angélica Aragón as Magdalena Dumont de Muriel
 Raúl Meraz as Don Alfonso Dumont
 Juan Peláez as Jerónimo Serrano
 Mariana Levy as Dulce Olivia Serrano
 Martha Roth as Leda Dumont
 Sebastián Ligarde as Abigail Jiménez
 Cecilia Toussaint as Laura Gamez
 Norma Lazareno as Gertrudis de Serrano
 Claudio Báez as Father Gerardo Serret
 Patricia Reyes Spíndola as Tota de Ortega
 Alejandro Tommasi as Alexis Ortega "El Albino"
 Susana Alexander as Mother Carolina Jones
 Liliana Weimer as Coral Labrada
 Oscar Narváez as Agustín Guzmán
 Marta Aura as Ángela
 Fernando Rubio as Hans
 Maya Ramos as Julia
 Fernando Amaya as Dr. Reyes
 Noé Murayama as Comandante Eusebio Obregón
 Manuel López Ochoa as Pacheco
 Alexis Ayala as Alejandro Tamaris
 Irán Eory as Susana Tamaris
 Verónica Terán as Astrid
 Carlos Águila as Dr. Murrieta
 José Carlos Infante as Enrique
 Lourdes Canale as Aurora
 Sebastián Rosas as Abel
 Joana Brito as Anabel
 Adrián Taboada as Manzano
 Marifer Malo as Estefanía Muriel (child)
 Arturo Romano Orozco as Alfonso Dumont (young)

Awards and nominations

References

External links 

1990 telenovelas
Mexican telenovelas
1990 Mexican television series debuts
1991 Mexican television series endings
Spanish-language telenovelas
Television shows set in Mexico
Televisa telenovelas